Friedrich Julius Schilsky (1848–1912) was a German entomologist.
He was secretary of the Entomological Society of Berlin. His principal work was a catalogue of German beetles Systematisches Verzeichnis der Käfer Deutschlands, mit besonderer Berücksichtigung ihrer geographischen Verbreitung. Zugleich ein Käfer-Verzeichnis der Mark Brandenburg (Berlin, 1888). In 1894, he continued Die Käfer Europas started by Heinrich Carl Küster (1807–1876), briefly succeeded by Ernst Gustav Kraatz (1831–1909) and Ernest August Hellmuth von Kiesenwetter (1820–1880). Schilsky, wrote the seventeen last volumes (completed  1911). His collections are in Museum für Naturkunde in Berlin.

References
Guido Nonveiller (2001). Pioneers of the Research on the Insects of Dalmatia. Croatian Natural History Museum (Zagreb) : 390 p.

German entomologists
1848 births
1912 deaths